Vampyrocrossota is a genus of hydrozoans of the family Rhopalonematidae. The genus only contains one species, Vampyrocrossota childressi. Unlike many hydromedusae, these animals do not have a sessile stage. Rather, they spend their entire lives in the water column as plankton. It is the only known species with a medusa that is truly black.

Distribution
Vampyrocrossota childressi has only been found in the Pacific Ocean off California and British Columbia. This deep-sea animal lives between 600–1475 m depth.

Etymology
This species was named after James J. Childress, a marine biologist  at the University of California, Santa Barbara who helped discover this jellyfish.

References

Rhopalonematidae
Monotypic cnidarian genera